The Emerald Empress is the name of several, fictional super-villains appearing American comic books published by DC Comics. The characters associated with the name name are often portrayed as a prominent adversary of the Legion of Super-Heroes. The first incarnation of the character appeared in Adventure Comics #352 (January 1967).

The first and mainstream version of the character is Sarya of Venegar, who discovered the Emerald Eye of Ekron and was corrupted by the artifact, awakening the evil dormant within the young woman and making her a conqueror. Sarya turned to a life of piracy and began to gain a following before later founding the Fatal Five and becoming an enemy of the Legion of Super-Heroes. The second incarnation of the character, Cera Kesh, is instead portrayed as a teenaged fan of the Legion of Super-Heroes who auditioned to be a part of the team, only to be turned away and mocked for her overweight and unattractive appearance. Sensing her anger and jealousy, the Emerald Eye of Ekron corrupts her into the second Emerald Empress, granting her both powers and the ability to become an idealized version of herself. The third incarnation of the character, Falyce, is a native of the planet Orando and victim of the planet's duke. Wishing for the power to slay her torturer, the Emerald Eye of Ekron makes the third Emerald Empress but drives her insane.

Fictional biographies

Sarya
Sarya of the planet Venegar (referred to simply as 'the Empress') was recruited by Superboy and the Legion to combat the menace of the Sun-Eater. Once the Sun-Eater was defeated, she joined the Fatal Five with Tharok, Validus, Mano and the Persuader.

The Empress had no innate super-powers; rather, she employed a powerful mystical item called the Emerald Eye of Ekron, an approximately 2' diameter sphere that obeyed her mental commands. The Eye could fly and emit blasts of energy, and allowed the Empress to fly as well as survive in space. The Eye's residual energy also gave her, on at least one occasion, super-strength. It caused her to grow to gigantic stature during one battle. The Eye could also reform itself if shattered.
The Eye is an item of immense power; it defeated Superboy (who is susceptible to magic generally) more than once, though it seemed to have more trouble with Mon-El, perhaps because he was immune to green Kryptonite and its blasts may have contained elements of it. Despite this, for unknown reasons, the Eye does not like green Kryptonite, and being exposed to a chunk of it has made the Eye flee on more than one occasion (leaving the Empress behind temporarily).

The Emerald Empress died when, at her request, Legionnaire Sensor Girl used her powers of illusion to mask Sarya's presence from the Emerald Eye of Ekron. As the Empress' body quickly withered and decomposed, she expressed relief to be free from the Eye's control, indicating both that their symbiotic relationship was unwilling and that the Empress was far older than she appeared.

Final Crisis
During Final Crisis, The Emerald Empress alongside the other Fatal Five members, was among the supervillains in Superboy-Prime's Legion of Super-Villains.

DC Rebirth
The Emerald Empress appears as one of Max Lord's super villains in Justice League vs. Suicide Squad during DC Rebirth. Empress was part of the first Suicide Squad, along with Lobo, Johnny Sorrow, Rustam and Doctor Polaris. The Empress was manipulated by Amanda Waller by potential information about Saturn Girl. When the first mission ended in disaster, Empress and the others were imprisoned. They were later freed by Maxwell as part of his own plan for domination. Empress escaped this multi-layered plan, with her eye severely damaged. This endangered her plan to stay in the current time. Realizing she might need help, she pondered recruiting four other allies.

Cera Kesh
Cera Kesh first appears in Legionnaires #2.

Slightly overweight and with poor skin, she was also telekinetic and sought to join the Legion through their open audition program. Mocked by Legion member Inferno (for whom she harbored an infatuation) for her appearance, Kesh fled in embarrassment and anger, and was found by the Emerald Eye. Transformed by it into an idealized version of herself, and with all the powers of the Eye boosting her own, she succumbed to the Eye's influence and turned to a life of crime with the other members of the Fatal Five. At the same time, Leland McCauley found a second Emerald Eye, with which he hoped to turn Ingria Olav into the new Emerald Empress. Instead, Cera killed her and gained the power of both Eyes.

She was not seen again, as the timeline she was a part of ended shortly thereafter.

Falyce
In Legion of Super-Heroes (vol. 6) Annual #1 (2011), the Eye finds a new Empress on the planet of Orando. This young girl fights Shrinking Violet, Light Lass, Sun Boy, Sensor Girl and Gates of the Legion before being defeated by Violet. The girl was released from the Eye's control, but the Eye itself managed to flee the planet.

Emerald Eye of Ekron

52 origin
According to the year-spanning maxiseries "52" (2006), the Eye was once a real eye for the cosmic entity called "Ekron". But somehow Emerald Empress got the Eye and got it to work for her.

In the present, the Emerald Eye has appeared in the pages of 52, in the possession of Lobo, and in The Brave and The Bold back in the hands of the Emerald Empress.

Lobo kept the item in a small chest under his supervision, unwilling to use its powers. When Starfire used the Eye to save the population of Sector 3500 from a swarm of strange creatures, Lobo revealed that he knew something about the origins of the Eye. An Emerald Head of Ekron also existed and was searching for its lost eyeball. Ekron is apparently a member of the Green Lantern Corps, but has been driven insane by the destruction of the Space Sector under his protection by Lady Styx. The Emerald Eye itself is later revealed as a precursor of the technology that later led to the power ring worn by all Green Lanterns, with less functionality but nevertheless a formidable weapon.

Other origins 
When the Eye was reintroduced in the Legion of Super-Heroes (vol. 6) Annual of 2011, none of this was acknowledged. Rather, Ekron was referred to as a world where the Eye had once been worshipped as a god. The 52 explanation also neglects any existence of the Eye wielded by Garryn Bek of L.E.G.I.O.N. in the 21st century.

Powers and abilities

Standalone abilities
The first incarnation of the Emerald Empress, Sarya, possessed limited independent abilities, possessing greater than average human strength, a trait possessed by inhabitants of Venagar. Much of her abilities are centered upon the Emerald Eye of Ekron, in which she controls through her own mind and willpower. Having a symbiotic relationship with the artifact, she draws power from it while the Eye draws focus and both are more powerful the closer they are.

Cera Kesh, the second incarnation of the Emerald Empress, possessed telekinesis.

Emerald Eye of Ekron
Each user of the Emerald Eye of Ekron gains access to its nearly unlimited levels of emerald/willpower energies (the same power source used by the Green Lantern Corps), making the artifact both indestructible and considered uncontainable. Due to its usage of the same willpower/emerald energy sources, it is considered related to the Oan's power battery used by the Green Lantern Corps.

Its powers allow it to project blasts strong enough to hurt Kryptonians, generate force fields to protect from attacks, see through every spectrum and wavelength, create energy constructs, hypnotize others, cast illusions, teleport people over short distances, and alter reality, like how Falyce rebuilt the planet Orando into a medieval-like society as she envisioned it. It can also grants its users the ability to fly and survive in space, superhuman strength, increase their size, enhance the innate skills of its current user, and turn them into ideal versions of themselves. The Eye itself is virtually indestructible and can instantly repair itself if shattered.

Other versions

Ingria Olav
Ingria Olav was a short-lived Emerald Empress who was the girlfriend of Legion of Super-Heroes foe, Leland McCauley IV. Having discovered the second Eye of Ekron, he recreated a Fatal Five team with Ingria serving as the team's new Emerald Empress. However, Ingria proved to be more cowardly and an unskilled user of the Eye of Ekron, being unable to stomach the life of a super-villainess. She is later tracked down by Cera Kesh, the other Emerald Empress and is vaporized by the woman, whom then takes the second Eye of Ekron for herself.

The Empress (Post Zero Hour)
After the Zero Hour event and the subsequent reboot of the Legion's continuity, a character simply called the 'Empress' appeared, unconnected to the Emerald Eye of Ekron (which appeared separately later). Although she had no powers, she was as dangerous as the rest of the Fatal Five, being a sadistic murderess who had taught herself how to kill any known lifeform.

The Eye itself was in possession of the supervillain Scavenger, but was discovered by Shrinking Violet, who fell under its control. With the Legion's help, Violet managed to break the Eye's hold on her, but not before she had sent half the team into the past and attracted the attention of the ancient sorcerer Mordru.

Eventually, the Eye came into the hands of the Empress. The Empress seemed to have broken the Eye's will, leaving her unequivocally in control.

This version of the Legion is still in continuity, but now established as taking place on a parallel world, which means that this Eye is not the same as the one the original Legion encountered, but the Eye of an alternate universe.

Reception
Emerald Empress was ranked 38th in Comics Buyer's Guide's "100 Sexiest Women in Comics" list. Russ Burlingame of 
Comicbook.com described her as "a big player in the DC Universe of late" and that "she's one of the most identifiable Legion villains, with a cool gimmick and a great visual" noting her appearance in Justice League vs. Suicide Squad and in a story that crossed Supergirl over with Batgirl.

In other media

Television

 The Cara Kesh incarnation of the Emerald Empress appears in the Justice League Unlimited episode "Far From Home", voiced by Joanne Whalley. This version of the Emerald Eye of Ekron's power exceeds that of a Green Lantern's power ring.
 The Sarya incarnation of the Emerald Empress appears in Legion of Super Heroes, voiced by Jennifer Hale in season one and Tara Strong in season two. This version was previously imprisoned and separated from the Emerald Eye of Ekron before joining the Fatal Five. Additionally, she suffers no ill effects if the Eye is damaged. She works with the Fatal Five to battle the titular Legion of Super-Heroes until Matter-Eater Lad puts himself into a coma to destroy the Eye and depower Sarya.
 The Emerald Eye of Ekron appears in Young Justice: Phantoms. This version is considered a magical artifact and was originally kept in Metron's vault until Lor-Zod travels back in time to steal it, after which it chooses his mother Ursa Zod to become the Emerald Empress of the 21st century.

Film
 An unidentified Emerald Empress makes a cameo appearance in Justice League: The New Frontier.
 An unidentified Emerald Empress appears in Justice League vs. the Fatal Five, voiced by Sumalee Montano. This version is the lover of Mano. She and Validus are sent back in time to the 21st century to be imprisoned on Oa since the Green Lantern Corps no longer exist in the 31st century. However, the rest of the Fatal Five travel back in time to rescue them before they begin plotting to rid their time of their enemies by using the Emerald Eye of Ekron to drain the Green Lantern Corps' Central Battery and destroy Earth's sun. While battling the Justice League and Star Boy, Jessica Cruz buries the Fatal Five alive under a mountain while Star Boy sacrifices himself to save the sun.

References

External links
Emerald Eye at Cosmic Teams Obscure Characters Index

Characters created by Curt Swan
Characters created by Jim Shooter
Comics characters introduced in 1967
DC Comics extraterrestrial supervillains
DC Comics female supervillains
DC Comics film characters
DC Comics television characters
Fictional emperors and empresses